Kalabo Central is a constituency of the National Assembly of Zambia. It covers part of Kalabo District in Western Province, including the town of Kalabo.

List of MPs

References 

Constituencies of the National Assembly of Zambia 
1964 establishments in Zambia 
Constituencies established in 1964